Diamocaine is a local anesthetic that was developed by Janssen Pharmaceuticals in the 1970s. It is a 4-phenylpiperidine derivative, structurally related to opioid drugs such as piminodine and antipsychotics such as haloperidol, but in this series only local anesthetics were produced.

See also 
 Dimethocaine
 Procaine
 Tetracaine

References 

Anilines
Ethers
Piperidines